Love in Time is an Hong Kong supernatural television drama produced by Ricky Wong's CTI, and is the company's first television drama since its establishment. The drama follows the love story between a cold 224-year-old vampire (Danson Tang) and a young human girl (Michelle Wai). A press conference was held on 9 May 2012.

Cast
Danson Tang as Roy Thackeray
Michelle Wai as Lok Hei-lam
Terence Yin as George Spenser
Sherming Yiu as Koo Yuet Mei-loi
Charles Ying as Ngai Sum
Kathy Yuen as Angelina
Carlos Chan as Max
Rachel Lam as Man Sze-tung
Wong Ho-ting as Heman
Bond Chan as Marcus Morris
Chan On-ying as Mrs. Lok
Kawaii Wong as Lee Chun-chun
Cherry Pau as Chan Hiu-yan
Nick Chong as Cheung Chi-keung
Sin Ho-ying as Boss Ma
Jeremy Luen as TX
Wong Kwun-bun as Ken
Alan Luk as Veterinary physician
Oscar Li as Lam Kwok-ho
Luvin Ho as Yip Yuk-ying
Crystal Leung as Ching

Plot
The story revolves around a kind-hearted vampire and a hardworking young woman who falls in love with each other.

Episodes
Number of episodes:- 24

Marketing
A teaser for the television drama was posted on December 10, 2012. A 6-minute preview video clip was posted on YouTube on June 2, 2013.

See also 
List of vampire television series

References

External links
 Official website

Hong Kong Television Network original programming
2012 Hong Kong television series debuts
2010s Hong Kong television series
Vampires in television